One on One is a 2014 South Korean film directed by Kim Ki-duk. It was the opening film of the 11th Venice Days sidebar at the 71st Venice International Film Festival.

At the 2014 Busan International Film Festival, Kim said during a stage interview that the film "is based on an incident that took place in recent years menacing democratic rights, but nobody ― no film critic or journalist ― has written a film review mentioning it," then offered  to the one who guesses correctly.

Plot
On May 9, a high school girl named Oh Min-ju is brutally murdered. Afterwards, the seven suspects are hunted down by seven members of a terrorist group called "Shadow."

Cast
Ma Dong-seok as Leader of Shadow
Kim Young-min as Oh Hyeon
Lee Yi-kyung as Shadow 1
Jo Dong-in as Shadow 2 
Teo Yoo as Shadow 3 
Ahn Ji-hye as Shadow 4 
Jo Jae-ryong as Shadow 5 
Kim Joong-ki as Shadow 6 
Joo Hee-joong as Jeong Yi-se 
Choi Gwi-hwa as Oh Ji-ha 
Hwang Geon as Oh Jeong-taek 
Yoo Yeon-soo as Jin Ho-seong 
Son Jong-hak as Byeon Oh-gu
Lim Hwa-young as Ji-hye 
Kim Jong-gu as Military general 
Lee Na-ra as Oh Ji-ha's wife

References

External links

Films directed by Kim Ki-duk
South Korean thriller films
2014 films
2010s South Korean films